The Filyovskaya line, or Line 4 and 4A, is a line of the Moscow Metro. Chronologically the sixth to open, it connects the major western districts of Dorogomilovo and Fili along with the Moscow-City with the city centre. At present it has 13 stations and is 14.9 kilometres long.

History
The history of the Filyovskaya line is one of the most complicated in Moscow Metro, due to the eastern radius falling victim of changing policies. Originally the earliest stations are the oldest, dating to 1935 and 1937 when they opened as part of the First stage and operated as a branch from what later became the Sokolnicheskaya line. In 1938 the branch service was liquidated, and the Arbatsko-Pokrovskaya line was created by trains now terminating at Kurskaya. However, during the Second World War, the station Arbatskaya suffered damage when a German bomb pierced its ceiling, as all of the 1930s stations were built subsurface.

The threat of the Cold War becoming real meant that these early stations were not suited to double as bomb shelters, and instead, a deep parallel section was built. This would have meant the end of the Filyovskaya line, had Nikita Khrushchev as part of his visit to New York City not been inspired by seeing elevated and surface lines. Upon his return, and coinciding with his pursuit to save costs on architecture and construction, he cancelled the planned deep-level extension to Fili and instead built a surface line that would see the old stations reopened. In 1958 the Arbatsko–Filyovskaya line was inaugurated, becoming the sixth to open (the term Arbatsko- was dropped later). The line continued to extend westwards reaching Fili in 1959, along with its separate depot, the Fili Park in 1961 and ultimately the housing complex of Kuntsevo in 1965. A further extension was built to a newer development in Krylatskoye in 1989.

All of the stations, save Molodyozhnaya and Krylatskoye, were at ground level, the original late 1950s trio was built to an identical side-platform configuration, while the remaining four with a standardised island platform. Despite the success in saving costs, the Russian climate, particularly the winter, the sharp bends, and the small station size made the line one of the most unpopular with passengers.

By the 21st century, however, Filyovskaya line's fate would change radically. First the rising Moscow City business centre required a metro line, and a two-station branch was opened from Kievskaya in 2005 to Delovoy Tsentr and again in 2006 to Mezhdunarodnaya. In December 2020 the route from Alexandrovsky Sad, line's eastern terminus, to Mezhdunarodnaya was given its own number  on metro maps.

Timeline

* Service branch of 0.9 km was used to connect Aleksandrovsky Sad and Ploshchad Revolyutsii.

** Segment exists as branch on route Aleksandrovskiy Sad – Kiyevskaya – Mezhdunarodnaya.

*** On 2 January 2008 the Filyovskaya line was shortened to its terminus at Kuntsevskaya, whilst the stations Molodyozhnaya and Krylatskoye were passed on to the Arbatsko-Pokrovskaya line

Name changes

Transfers

Rolling stock
The line is served by the Fili (№ 9) depot and currently the whole fleet is undergoing replacement. The oldest E type trains in Moscow were retired in 2009. Six carriage fleet of 24 trains (a mix of Ezh, Ezh1, Em-508 and Em-509) will was passed on to other depots and replaced by the new 81–740.1/741.1 "Rusich" (also known as "Skif") which are more suited for the outdoor climate that the line has. Also, there are five old 81-717/714 trains from Koltsevaya and Kalininskaya lines. They are mostly running on the "Aleksandrovsky sad" – "Mezhdunarodnaya" line, but some trains are running on the main line to "Kuntsevskaya".

In the summer of 2018, the operation of new 81-765.2/766.2/767.2 "Moskva" trains began. By December 2018 the line was solely operating 81–765.2/766.2/767.2s. The 81-765/766/767s are also suited for the outdoor climates the line has but have gangways between every carriage and are more advanced.

Subway car types used on the line over the years:

 Series A, B: 1935 - 1953
 Series V: 1958 - 1962
 Series D: 1961 - 1992
 Series E: 1986 - 2007
 Series Ezh, Em-508 and Em-509: 1986 - 2009
 Series 81-740A/741A: 2005 - 2006
 Series 81-740.1/741.1: 2005 - 2019
 Series 81-717/714: 2011 - 2018
 Series 81-765.2/766.2/767.2: 2018 - present

Recent developments and future plans

After the line lost its terminus, its passenger flow dropped substantially, making it more local. Presently work is planned to upgrade the surface stations, and to finish replacement of the rolling stock. The branch service originally having 15 minute intervals now has 5 min which makes 1:1 ratio of trains traveling from Aleksandrovsky Sad.

External links

Filyovskaya line photos and info on the Robert Schwandl's UrbanRail site
Filyovskaya line gallery on the Urban Electric Transit

Moscow Metro lines
Railway lines opened in 1958